Uzoamaka Doris Aniunoh  is a Nigerian writer and actor. She has been a regular cast member of MTV Shuga appearing in several series including the first and the sixth.

Life 
Aniunoh was born in Onitsha. She studied at the University of Nigeria and gained followers to a blog she created. In 2015 she moved to the UK where she studied creative writing at the University of Birmingham gaining a master's degree.

Actor 

She returned to Nigeria in 2017 and attended the open auditions for a new series named MTV Shuga. She was one on the few actors chosen as her role was to be Cynthia. She had taken the advice of Niyi Akinmolayan in preparing for the audition and the same advice got her a role in Rumour Has It for Ndani TV.

She has been a lead in the film "Stuck" with Seun Ajayi and Lala Akindoju.

Series six of MTV Shuga returned to be based once again in Nigeria and Aniunoh was contracted to play Cynthia once again in that years series sub-titled "Choices". Fellow actors included Timini Egbuson, Rahama Sadau, Yakubu Mohammed, Bukola Oladipupo, Helena Nelson and Ruby Akabueze.

Aniunoh was in series six of MTV Shuga and the role of Cynthia was included when it went into a mini-series titled MTV Shuga Alone Together highlighting the problems of Coronavirus on 20 April 2020. The series was written by Tunde Aladese and broadcast every night - its backers include the United Nations. The series was based in Nigeria, South Africa, Kenya and Côte d'Ivoire and the story progresses using on-line conversations on location between the characters. All of the filming was done by the actors who include Lerato Walaza, Mamarumo Marokane, Jemima Osunde, Folu Storms and Aniunoh.

She plays the role of Kumene in Africa Magic's Riona.

She was listed as a Nigerian actress to look forward to in 2021 by Nigerian Entertainment Today.

She starred alongside Neo Akpofure in the short film Sister Rose. She was also in a short film Title Ije.

In 2022 she starred in the Nigerian streaming series Diiche which was produced by James Omokwe and co-starrs were Uzoamaka Onuoha, Chinyere Wilfred, Gloria Anozie-Young and Frank Konwea. The premier in October in Lagos was hosted by Chigul.

Writer 
Aniunoh is also a writer and has had work published. An excerpt from her work Balcony was edited and published by the Nigerian writer Chimamanda Ngozi Adichie.

Filmography

Television 
MTV Shuga 
MTV Shuga Alone Together 
Rumor Has it
Riona 
Diiche

Films 
Ponzi 
Stuck 
Ife 
The Zipman 
Sister Rose
Ananze 
A Naija Christmas
Mami Wata

See also
 List of Nigerian actors

References 

Nigerian television actresses
Living people
Year of birth missing (living people)
People from Onitsha
Alumni of the University of Birmingham
Nigerian film actresses
21st-century Nigerian actresses
Igbo people
Nigerian writers